9 The Shambles is an historic building in the English city of York, North Yorkshire.

The two-storey timber framed building was constructed in the 15th century.  Both the upper floor and the attic are jettied to The Shambles.  The building might originally have been of three bays, but only two survive, and it now adjoins two roughly built bays, dating from the 16th century.  The whole roof at the front also dates from this period.  A brick chimney breast dates from the 17th century, with a contemporary fireplace in the attic.  In the 18th century, the level of the first floor was raised, and the front was pargetted.

The building was grade II* listed in 1954, and was restored from 1955 onwards.  Since 2007, the shop has been the W. Hamond jewellers, which specialises in Whitby jet.

Gallery

References

09
Houses in North Yorkshire
Buildings and structures in North Yorkshire
15th-century establishments in England
Grade II* listed buildings in York
Grade II* listed houses
15th century in York